Stephen Anthony Head (born January 13, 1984), is an American professional baseball scout and former infielder and outfielder, who is currently a scout of the Los Angeles Dodgers organization. He played college baseball at Ole Miss for head coach Mike Bianco from 2003 to 2005 before playing professionally from 2005 to 2011. He then spent 4 years as an assistant coach at Ole Miss (2012–2015)

Early years
Head attended Hillcrest Christian School (Jackson, Mississippi) and the University of Mississippi. He was the designated hitter for the United States national baseball team during the 2003 Pan American Games, receiving a silver medal for his efforts. In 2004, Head was the inaugural recipient of the Ferriss Trophy (now the C Spire Ferriss Trophy), awarded annually to Mississippi's top collegiate baseball player. Head was selected by the Cleveland Indians with the 62nd overall pick in the 2005 Major League Baseball draft.

Professional baseball
From 2005 through 2009, Head played in the Indians' farm system, reaching as high as Triple-A with the Columbus Clippers. Head spent the 2008 season with the Akron Aeros and helped lead the team to the Eastern League Championship Series. He played in 2010 with the independent Southern Illinois Miners of the Frontier League. His final season of professional baseball was 2011, when he pitched for the Class A-Short Season Tri-City Dust Devils, and the Class A Asheville Tourists within the Colorado Rockies organization.

References

External links

1984 births
Living people
Akron Aeros players
Asheville Tourists players
Baseball coaches from Mississippi
Baseball first basemen
Baseball outfielders
Baseball players at the 2003 Pan American Games
Baseball players from Mississippi
Columbus Clippers players
Kinston Indians players
Ole Miss Rebels baseball coaches
Ole Miss Rebels baseball players
Los Angeles Dodgers scouts
Mahoning Valley Scrappers players
Pan American Games medalists in baseball
Pan American Games silver medalists for the United States
People from Raymond, Mississippi
Southern Illinois Miners players
Tri-City Dust Devils players
United States national baseball team players
Medalists at the 2003 Pan American Games